The Kiskút Open is a series of back-to-back tournaments for professional female tennis players played on indoor clay courts. The events are classified as $100,000 and $60,000 ITF Women's Circuit tournaments and has been held in Székesfehérvár, Hungary, since 2019. Starting in 2023, a men's tournament was held as part of the ATP Challenger Tour.

Past finals

Women's singles

Women's doubles

Men's singles

Men's doubles

External links 
 ITF search
 Official website

ITF Women's World Tennis Tour
Clay court tennis tournaments
Tennis tournaments in Hungary
Recurring sporting events established in 2019